Lewis Edward Herzog (15 October 1868, Philadelphia27 May 1943, Washington, D.C.) was an American landscape painter, associated with the Düsseldorfer Malerschule.

Life and work 
His father, Hermann Ottomar Herzog, was a well known German landscape painter, originally from Bremen, who moved his family to Philadelphia not long before Lewis' birth.

He travelled extensively, visiting London, Rome, Berlin and Munich, until 1888, when he enrolled at the Kunstakademie Düsseldorf. There, he studied with Heinrich Lauenstein, Adolf Schill, Hugo Crola, Johann Peter Theodor Janssen and the engraver, Carl Ernst Forberg. From 1891 to 1893, he was in the master landscape class of Eugen Dücker. Upon graduating, he took a long study trip to Venice with his friend, Alfred Sohn-Rethel. In 1897, he participated in the Venice Biennale. Unlike his father, whose landscapes were very staid, he portrayed people and animals in motion.

Back in the United States, in 1898, he held an exhibition of his European paintings at the Pennsylvania Academy of the Fine Arts. That same year, he was commissioned by Harper’s Magazine to paint scenes from the Spanish-American War. In 1904, his paintings were awarded a bronze medal at the Louisiana Purchase Exposition in St. Louis. 

After 1909, he and his family lived on North Haven Island in Penobscot Bay. During World War I, he worked for the US Navy camouflage unit. He continued to exhibit frequently throughout the 1920s.

He died in Washington, while on a train trip home from Quantico, Virginia.

References

External links 

1868 births
1943 deaths
19th-century American painters
American landscape painters
Kunstakademie Düsseldorf alumni
Artists from Philadelphia
20th-century American painters